H Album: Hand (stylized as H album -H・A・N・D-) is the eighth studio album of the Japanese duo KinKi Kids. After nearly a year without an album-release, the duo released H Album: Hand on November 16, 2005. It debuted at the top of the Oricon charts, selling 245,681 copies in its first week. The album was certified platinum by the RIAJ for 250,000 copies shipped to stores in Japan.

Track listing

References

 H Album: Hand. Johnny's net. Retrieved November 1, 2009.

External links
 Official KinKi Kids website

2005 albums
KinKi Kids albums